Antauta District is one of nine districts of the province Melgar in Peru.

Geography 
Some of the highest mountains of the district are listed below:

Ethnic groups 
The people in the district are mainly indigenous citizens of Quechua descent. Quechua is the language which the majority of the population (69.23%) learnt to speak in childhood, 30.28% of the residents started speaking using the Spanish language (2007 Peru Census).

References